The Shine Nova Championship is a championship contested in the professional wrestling promotion Shine Wrestling. Renee Michelle is the current champion in her first reign.

History

The Nova Championship was first announced on SHINE's Facebook account which stated that there would be a championship for up and coming talent. The tournament started on July 14 at SHINE 43 and ended on July 16 at SHINE 44.

, there have been 6 championship reigns with 6 different champions. The inaugural champion was Priscilla Kelly. She won the title by defeating Candy Cartwright at Shine 44 on July 16, 2017. Priscilla Kelly successfully defend her title against ACR at Full Impact Pro's Everything Burns Event February 2, 2018 at The Orpheum in Ybor City. Kelly again defended her title at Shine 49 where she was defeated by Candy Cartwright. On Shine 54, Shotzi Blackheart defeated Aja Perera to be the fourth champion. The fifth and sixth champions, Natalia Markova and The WOAD, won their titles on December 14, 2019 and September 19, 2021, respectively.

Inaugural Championship Tournament (2017)

The tournament was held over 2 nights at the "Shine 43" and "Shine 44" events at the Orpheum in Ybor City, Florida.

Reigns

See also 
 Shine Championship
 Shine Tag Team Championship

References

External links
 SHINE Nova Championship

Women's professional wrestling championships
WWNLive championships